Juha Alm (born 2 May 1969) is a Finnish cross-country skier. He competed in the 50 kilometre freestyle event at the 1998 Winter Olympics.

Cross-country skiing results
All results are sourced from the International Ski Federation (FIS).

Olympic Games

World Cup

Season standings

References

External links
 

1969 births
Living people
Finnish male cross-country skiers
Olympic cross-country skiers of Finland
Cross-country skiers at the 1998 Winter Olympics
People from Rovaniemi
Sportspeople from Lapland (Finland)
20th-century Finnish people